Bülent Yıldırım may refer to:

Bülent Yıldırım (referee) (born 1972), Turkish football referee
Fehmi Bülent Yıldırım (born 1966), Turkish lawyer